Split is the third studio album by English rock band Lush, released on 4AD on 13 June 1994 in the United Kingdom and a day later in the US. Two commercial singles were released from the album: "Desire Lines" and "Hypocrite", both released on 30 May 1994. Split was reissued by 4AD on CD in July 2001.

Recording
Lush chose to work with producer Mike Hedges because they "loved" his work on Sulk by the Associates, A Kiss in the Dreamhouse by Siouxsie and the Banshees, and Seventeen Seconds by the Cure, according to Miki Berenyi. They first recorded at Rockfield in Wales and then mixed at Hedges's house in France, but as Phil King remembered it, "it sounded as flat as a pancake, no dynamics at all". They finally decided to have the entire album remixed by Alan Moulder, because he had already worked with My Bloody Valentine and Ride. Berenyi's verdict was positive, "Alan was brilliant".

Reception

Selects Roy Wilkinson gave the album a negative review, describing it as "mid-paced stuff, fitting between melancholy and listlessness". The review went on to state, "There's nothing wrong with a dose of heavyweight introspection per se. But a pretty deft touch is needed to translate it movingly to the recording studio".

In a retrospective review, Andy Kellman, writing for AllMusic, was far more positive: "Split touches on most forms of emotional turbulence. A legitimizing stunner, the record prevented the band from being lost amidst the bunker of form-over-function dream pop bands. Split shattered every negative aspect of those failed acts with flying colors. A fantastic record within any realm." In 2018, Pitchfork ranked the album at number 27 on its list of "The 30 Best Dream Pop Albums".

Track listing

Release history

Singles
"Hypocrite" (30 May 1994)
CD (BAD 4008 CD); 12" vinyl (BAD 4008)
 "Hypocrite" – 2:58
 "Love at First Sight" – 5:12 (The Gist cover, written by Stuart Moxham)
 "Cat's Chorus" – 3:23
 "Undertow (Spooky Remix)" – 9:13
7" vinyl (AD 4008)
 "Hypocrite" – 2:58
 "Cat's Chorus" – 3:23
"Desire Lines" (30 May 1994)
CD (BAD 4010 CD); 12" vinyl (BAD 4010)
 "Desire Lines" – 7:29
 "White Wood" – 4:14
 "Girl's World" – 4:56
 "Lovelife (Suga Bullit Remix)" – 8:15
7" vinyl (AD 4010)
 "Desire Lines" – 7:29
 "Girl's World" – 4:56
"When I Die" (promo only, June 1994)
Radio promo CD (PRO-CD-7048)
 "When I Die (Scott Litt Remix)" – 4:20
 "Light from a Dead Star (Album Version)" – 3:17
 "Lovelife (Album Version)" – 3:57
"Lovelife" (promo only, 1994)
Radio promo CD (PRO-CD-7092)
 "Lovelife (Album Version)" – 3:56
 "Lovelife (Suga Bullit Remix Edit)" – 5:28
 "Lovelife (Suga Bullit Remix)" – 8:15

Personnel
Lush
Chris Acland – drums
Emma Anderson – guitars, vocals
Miki Berenyi – vocals, guitars 
Phil King – bass

Charts

References

1994 albums
Lush (band) albums
Albums produced by Mike Hedges
4AD albums
Albums recorded at Rockfield Studios
Albums recorded in a home studio